Silver Street may be:

 Silver Street, a radio soap opera
 Silver Street, Cambridge, England
 Silver Street, London
 Silver Street railway station, Edmonton, London, England
 Silver Street, Bath, a Local Nature Reserve in England
 "Silver Street", a song by Ben Folds released on Ben Folds Live and Fifty-Five Vault